The 2017 Liga 3 Final is a football match to determine the winner of the 2017 Liga 3 between Persik Kendal and Blitar United. The match will held on 17 December 2017 at Gelora Bumi Kartini Stadium, Jepara.

Route to the final

Match

References

2017 in Indonesian football